Papyrus 59 (in the Gregory-Aland numbering), signed by 𝔓59, is a copy of the New Testament in Greek. It is a papyrus manuscript of the Gospel of John. The manuscript has been palaeographically assigned to the seventh century.

 Contents 
Gospel of John 1:26.28.48.51; 2:15-16; 11:40-52; 12:25.29.31.35; 17:24-26; 18:1-2.16-17.22; 21:7.12-13.15.17-20.23.

 Text 
The Greek text of this codex is a mixed text-type. Aland placed it in Category III.

 Location
It is currently housed at the Morgan Library & Museum (P. Colt 3) in New York City.

See also 

 List of New Testament papyri

References

Further reading 
 L. Casson, and E. L. Hettich, Excavations at Nessana II, Literary Papyri (Princeton: 1946), pp. 79–93.

New Testament papyri
7th-century biblical manuscripts
Collection of the Morgan Library & Museum
Gospel of John papyri